Samuel Mitchell Brinson (March 20, 1870 – April 13, 1922) was an American politician.

Brinson was born in New Bern, Craven County, North Carolina, to William George Brinson and Kittie Elizabeth Brinson. He was the member of the United States House of Representatives for the North Carolina 3rd district from  1919 to 1922. He died in office on April 13, 1922, and is buried at Cedar Grove Cemetery, New Bern, North Carolina.  An obituary noted that Mr. Brinson had died of an undisclosed illness "that dated back to the close of the campaign in 1918".  During the recess in Congress, Brinson had gone to the Battle Creek Sanitarium in Michigan and, as his condition, went back to New Bern, North Carolina where he was admitted to New Bern General Hospital after his arrival, six days before his death.

See also
List of United States Congress members who died in office (1900–49)

External links
Political Graveyard
Samuel M. Brinson, late a representative from North Carolina, Memorial addresses delivered in the House of Representatives and Senate frontispiece 1924

References

Politicians from New Bern, North Carolina
1870 births
1922 deaths
Democratic Party members of the United States House of Representatives from North Carolina